Hunterdon Medical Center is a 178-bed non-profit community hospital located in Raritan Township, New Jersey near Flemington. In 2021 it was given a grade A by the Leapfrog patient safety organization.

Hunterdon Medical Center was founded in 1946 and opened in 1953, a culmination of efforts by the Hunterdon County Board of Agriculture to provide rural medical care to the region. Hunterdon at the time was the only county in the state without a hospital.

Since 1972 Hunterdon Medical Center been affiliated with the Robert Wood Johnson Medical School at the University of Medicine and Dentistry of New Jersey. A three-year Family Medicine Residency Program is offered 
through this teaching affiliation.

In January 2019 Pat Gavin was appointed Hunterdon Healthcare System President and CEO.

Hunterdon Medical Center is located near Route 31 on Wescott Drive, named in honor of one of its founders, Lloyd Wescott.

References

Hospital buildings completed in 1953
Hospitals in New Jersey
Buildings and structures in Hunterdon County, New Jersey
University of Medicine and Dentistry of New Jersey
1946 establishments in New Jersey
Hospitals established in 1946
Raritan Township, New Jersey